Kruszewiec  (German Krausendorf) is a village in the administrative district of Gmina Kętrzyn, within Kętrzyn County, Warmian-Masurian Voivodeship, in northern Poland.

The village has a population of 195.

References

Kruszewiec